Barlin or Bärlin may refer to:

People
 Jorge Barlin (1850-1909), Filipino bishop
 Stefan Bärlin (born 1976), Swedish footballer

Places
 Barlin, Pas-de-Calais, France
 Barlin Acres, Massachusetts, United States
 Canton of Barlin, Pas-de-Calais, France

See also
 Berlin (disambiguation)